WABA League, commonly known as the Adriatic League, is a top-level regional basketball league, featuring female teams from Serbia, Montenegro, Bosnia and Herzegovina, North Macedonia, Bulgaria, Slovenia and Croatia. Clubs from Austria, Turkey, Hungary and Italy had their representatives in WABA League in past seasons. Since 2012 a Cadet WABA League and since 2014 Pionir WABA League is also played.

History

Formation and early years
WABA League was established in 2001 as EWWL League. In its first season it included six teams from four countries (Austria, Slovenia, Croatia and Bosnia and Herzegovina). After the regular season, it held a tournament in which the three best teams played, which was won by  Athlete Celje. Next season the league expanded from six to eight teams, and the final tournament was altered so that the placement included the four top teams. At the final tournament the winner was Željezničar Sarajevo.

In 2003 the league changed its name to EWWL Trocal League, which lasted until 2006, and during these seasons the number of teams who played in the league varied from nine to twelve. In the period from 2004 to 2006 it had a representative from Macedonia and then one from Bulgaria in the 2006–07 season. Austrian clubs left the competition in 2004. Since 2003, the competing teams have been from Serbia and Montenegro. In 2006 the league changed its name to WABA NBL which it used till 2008. In 2006 the WABA Cup launched, which existed until 2010, which was attended by participants in the league. The WABA Cup in the year 2007 bore the name Vojko Herskel. In the 2008–09 season the league was named after WABA Multipover; in 2009–10 season, IWBL.

2010s years
In 2010 the league changed to the present name, MŽRKL. The Vojko Herksel Cup was last played. In the 2012–13 season the league included the Hungarian PEAC-Pécs; and the Belgrade Partizan achieved a record in its history, playing 32 matches in the national competitions (regional league, championship and cup) all season without suffering a defeat. In the season of 2013–14  the format of the competition changed. Twelve teams which participated in the league were divided into two groups of six teams. Four first placed teams were placed in the quarterfinals, with the winners to the Final Four.

In season 2015-16 is introduced instead of quarterfinals League 6 in which the first phase in which the two groups are placed by 3 teams. The League 6 transmitted the results achieved against teams from the same group in the first phase they finished the League 6. League 6 plays dual circuit system (one game at home and one away) against teams that have qualified from the opposite group previous stage of the competition. At the Final Four will finish in four best teams in the League 6.

In September 2016, the league officially changed his name to WABA League. In June 2017, the league sign sponsorship contract with tourist agency BTravel and officially changed his name to BTravel WABA League from the sponsorship reasons.

Names in history
EWWL League (2001–2003)
EWWL Trocal League (2003–2006)
WABA NBL (2006–2008)
WABA Multipower (2008–2009)
IWBL (2009–2010)
MŽRKL (2010–2016)
WABA League (2016–present)

Logos

Youth competition

Cadet WABA League
In the season 2012–13, the Cadet League was launched, and since it has shown a lot of success in that period, it has continued to be held. The winner of the first two seasons of cadet WABA League is the team Trešnjevka 2009 from Croatia, when he beat the team of Novi Zagreb and Crvena zvezda. In the third seasonis the champion was the team of Triglav Kranj, Slovenia, which is defeated in the final match of Maribor.

Pionir WABA League
Following the success of cadet league, a decision was made to launch the pioneering leagues. In the first season, the winner of the pioneering league is team Croatia 2006 from Zagreb, Croatia, that won at the team of Jedinstvo Tuzla from Tuzla, Bosnia and Herzegovina.

Finals

Champions

Notable person's

Former players

Former coaches
Stipe Bralić
Slađan Ivić
Marina Maljković
Dragan Vuković

Awards

Most Valuable Player

Final Four Most Valuable Player

Top Scorer

Sponsors
Title sponsor
BTravel (Croatian tourist agency) (June 2017 - 2018)

See also
 Vojko Herksel Cup

References

External links
 
 Profile at Eurobasket.com

  
Multi-national women's basketball leagues in Europe
Basketball leagues in Serbia
Basketball leagues in Montenegro
Basketball leagues in Serbia and Montenegro
Sports leagues established in 2001
2001 establishments in Europe
Professional sports leagues in Serbia
Professional sports leagues in Slovenia
Multi-national professional sports leagues